Cleveland Franklin (born April 24, 1955) is a former professional American football running back in the National Football League. He played five seasons for the Philadelphia Eagles and the Baltimore Colts.

1955 births
Living people
People from Brenham, Texas
Players of American football from Texas
American football running backs
Baylor Bears football players
Philadelphia Eagles players
Baltimore Colts players